Anthony Geoffrey Jordan Rimell (29 August 1928 – 18 October 2007) was an English first-class cricketer. Rimell was a left-handed batsman who bowled right-arm off break.

Rimell made his first-class debut for Hampshire in 1946 against Surrey.

In 1949 Rimell made his debut for Cambridge University against Lancashire. Rimell played 21 first-class matches for Cambridge University from 1949 to 1950, with his debut season being his final match for the university coming against Oxford University in 1950. Rimell was an all-rounder, scoring 772 runs at a batting average of 28.59, with three half centuries and a single century against Worcestershire in 1949 which yielded Rimell his highest first-class score of 160. With the ball Rimell took 39 wickets for the university at a bowling average of 35.38, with one five wicket haul against Gloucestershire which gave him career best figures of 6/100.

Rimell's final first-class appearance came in his second and final appearance for Hampshire in the 1950 County Championship against Worcestershire.

Rimell also represented the British Army in two non-first-class matches in 1948 and 1949.

Rimell died at Sonning, Berkshire on 18 October 2007.

External links
Anthony Rimell at Cricinfo
Anthony Rimell at CricketArchive
Matches and detailed statistics for Anthony Rimell

1928 births
2007 deaths
English cricketers
British Army cricketers
Hampshire cricketers
Cambridge University cricketers
Alumni of the University of Cambridge